Pioneer Soundtracks is the debut album by the British alternative rock band Jack, released in June 1996. It was produced by Peter Walsh, who had previously worked with Scott Walker.

Despite excellent reviews and extensive touring in both the United Kingdom and Europe sales were disappointing. Three tracks from the album - "Wintercomessummer", "White Jazz", and "Biography Of A First Son" - were released as singles but failed to pick up significant airplay.

A belated 'Tenth Anniversary Edition' featuring an additional CD of alternative versions, B-sides and live tracks was released on Spinney Records in March 2007.

Track listing

References

Alternative rock albums by British artists
1996 debut albums